Jahanabad (also Romanized as Jahānābād; also known as Dīvdān, Jahānābād-e Dīvdān, and Moḩammadābād) is a village in Korbal Rural District, in the Central District of Kharameh County, Fars Province, Iran.

Population Census
At the 2006 census, its population was 478, in 112 families.

References 

Populated places in Kharameh County
Districts of Iran